The 2016 Big East Conference softball tournament was held at The Ballpark at Rosemont in Rosemont, Illinois. The tournament, hosted by DePaul University, ran May 13 through May 14, 2016 and determined the champion for the Big East Conference for the 2016 NCAA Division I softball season. Fourth-seeded  won the tournament for the first time and earned the Big East Conference's automatic bid to the 2016 NCAA Division I softball tournament. The entire tournament aired on Fox Sports 2. Dave Bernhard and Bob Brainerd served as the broadcasters for Fox.

Format and seeding
The top four teams from the conference's round-robin regular season qualified for the tournament, and were seeded one through four.  They played a single-elimination tournament.

Tournament

All-Tournament Team
The following players were named to the All-Tournament Team.

Most Outstanding Player
Sarah Dixon was named Tournament Most Outstanding Player.  Dixon was an outfielder for Butler.

References

Big East Tournament
Big East Conference softball tournament
Big East Conference softball tournament